This is a list of colleges and universities entirely in, or with a campus in, Nassau or Suffolk County. For institutions in the Long Island sections of Brooklyn and Queens, two of New York City's five boroughs, see the separate List of colleges and universities in New York City.

Public

Federal Service Academies
United States Merchant Marine Academy - Kings Point

State University of New York
Stony Brook University - Stony Brook
 Stony Brook Southampton - Southampton
SUNY Old Westbury - Old Westbury
Farmingdale State College - Farmingdale
Nassau Community College - Garden City
Suffolk County Community College - Campuses in Selden, Riverhead, and Brentwood
Sayville Downtown Center - Sayville
Culinary Arts and Hospitality Center - Riverhead

Private
Adelphi University - Garden City
Adelphi Hauppauge Education and Conference Center in Hauppauge
Five Towns College - Dix Hills
Hofstra University - Hempstead
Donald and Barbara Zucker School of Medicine at Hofstra/Northwell
Maurice A. Deane School of Law
Long Island University
LIU Post - Brookville
LIU Brentwood - regional campus in Brentwood
LIU Riverhead - regional campus in Riverhead
Molloy University - Rockville Center
Molloy University Suffolk Center in Farmingdale
New York Institute of Technology - Old Westbury
New York Institute of Technology College of Osteopathic Medicine

St. Joseph's University - Patchogue
Touro College and University System
Touro College Graduate School of Education - Bay Shore
Touro College School of Health Sciences - Bay Shore
Touro Law Center - Central Islip
Cold Spring Harbor Laboratory School of Biological Sciences - Cold Spring Harbor
Webb Institute - Glen Cove

Satellite and branch campuses
St. John's University - Hauppauge

References

Universities and colleges in New York (state)
New York (state) education-related lists
Long Island